The hexynes are a subgroup from the group of alkynes. It consists of several isomeric compounds having the formula C6H10.

The linear and branched members are:
 1-Hexyne (n-butylacetylene)
 2-Hexyne (methylpropylacetylene)
 3-Hexyne (diethylacetylene)
 3-methylpent-1-yne
 4-methylpent-1-yne
 4-methylpent-2-yne
 3,3-dimethylbut-1-yne

Alkynes